Magama is a Local Government Area in Niger State, Nigeria. Its headquarters are in the town of Nasko in the west of the area.

It has an area of 4,107 km and a population of 181,653 at the 2006 census.

The postal code of the area is 923.

References

Local Government Areas in Niger State